Zubayda Khatun (died 1099, Ray) was a granddaughter of Dawud Chaghri Beg, wife and cousin of Malik-Shah I. She was the mother of sultan Berkyaruq.

Biography 
Zubayda was born to Emir Yaquti, son of Chaghri Beg. She married and influenced her cousin Malik-Shah I, giving birth to Berkyaruq in 1081. After Berkyaruq became the Seljuk Sultan, Zubayda's brother-in-law Tutush I rebelled. After Berkyaruk suppressed the rebellion and killed his uncle, he wanted to bring his mother with him, although his vizier Mu'ayyid al-Mulk opposed this. As a result of this, Mu'ayyid al-Mulk was dismissed and his brother Fakhr al-Mulk was appointed as the vizier. Berkyaruq's brother Muhammad Tapar later rebelled and declared himself as Sultan, reappointing Mu'ayyid al-Mulk, who had Zubayda Khatun captured and killed.

In popular culture 
Zubayda Khatun is portrayed by Sezin Akbaşoğulları in the Turkish historical drama The Great Seljuks: Guardians of Justice.

See also 
 Terken Khatun (wife of Malik-Shah I)

References 

1099 deaths
11th-century Turkic women
Princesses
Seljuk dynasty
Turkic female royalty